Teresa Leyva (born 1965) is a Colombian chess player and two time Colombian Women's Chess Champion (1976, 1982).

Biography
From the mid-1970s to the mid-1980s, she was one of the leading Colombian women's chess players. She has two wins at the Colombian Women's Chess Championships (1976, 1982).

Teresa Leyva played for Colombia in the Women's Chess Olympiads:
 In 1976, at first board in the 7th Chess Olympiad (women) in Haifa (+1, =5, -2),
 In 1980, at second board in the 9th Chess Olympiad (women) in Valletta (+3, =3, -4),
 In 1982, at first reserve board in the 10th Chess Olympiad (women) in Lucerne (+5, =4, -0) and won individual gold medal.

References

External links
 
 

1965 births
Living people
Colombian female chess players
Chess Olympiad competitors
20th-century Colombian women